Nemapteryx nenga or kata  is a sea catfish found in the Arabian Sea, the Bay of Bengal and the Pacific Ocean off of Thailand. It is found in marine as well as brackish waters and reaches a length of 30 cm.

References

 

Ariidae
Catfish of Asia
Fish of the Indian Ocean
Fish of the Pacific Ocean
Marine fish of Southeast Asia
Fish of India
Fish of Bangladesh
Fish of Pakistan
Fish of Thailand
Fish described in 1822
Taxa named by Francis Buchanan-Hamilton